Chloroclystis variospila is a moth in the family Geometridae. It was described by Warren in 1895. It is found on Peninsular Malaysia.

The forewings are greenish or greyish green with fuscous cross lines, mixed with red scales. The hindwings are pale grey, becoming greenish towards the hindmargin, with three or four indistinct darker curved fasciae.

References

External links

Moths described in 1895
variospila
Endemic fauna of Malaysia